In six-dimensional geometry, a cantellated 6-simplex is a convex uniform 6-polytope, being a cantellation of the regular 6-simplex.

There are unique 4 degrees of cantellation for the 6-simplex, including truncations.

Cantellated 6-simplex

Alternate names 
 Small rhombated heptapeton (Acronym: sril) (Jonathan Bowers)

Coordinates 
The vertices of the cantellated 6-simplex can be most simply positioned in 7-space as permutations of (0,0,0,0,1,1,2). This construction is based on facets of the cantellated 7-orthoplex.

Images

Bicantellated 6-simplex

Alternate names 
 Small prismated heptapeton (Acronym: sabril) (Jonathan Bowers)

Coordinates 
The vertices of the bicantellated 6-simplex can be most simply positioned in 7-space as permutations of (0,0,0,1,1,2,2). This construction is based on facets of the bicantellated 7-orthoplex.

Images

Cantitruncated 6-simplex

Alternate names 
 Great rhombated heptapeton (Acronym: gril) (Jonathan Bowers)

Coordinates 
The vertices of the cantitruncated 6-simplex can be most simply positioned in 7-space as permutations of (0,0,0,0,1,2,3). This construction is based on facets of the cantitruncated 7-orthoplex.

Images

Bicantitruncated 6-simplex

Alternate names 
 Great birhombated heptapeton (Acronym: gabril) (Jonathan Bowers)

Coordinates 
The vertices of the bicantitruncated 6-simplex can be most simply positioned in 7-space as permutations of (0,0,0,1,2,3,3). This construction is based on facets of the bicantitruncated 7-orthoplex.

Images

Related uniform 6-polytopes 
The truncated 6-simplex is one of 35 uniform 6-polytopes based on the [3,3,3,3,3] Coxeter group, all shown here in A6 Coxeter plane orthographic projections.

Notes

References
 H.S.M. Coxeter: 
 H.S.M. Coxeter, Regular Polytopes, 3rd Edition, Dover New York, 1973 
 Kaleidoscopes: Selected Writings of H.S.M. Coxeter, edited by F. Arthur Sherk, Peter McMullen, Anthony C. Thompson, Asia Ivic Weiss, Wiley-Interscience Publication, 1995,  
 (Paper 22) H.S.M. Coxeter, Regular and Semi Regular Polytopes I, [Math. Zeit. 46 (1940) 380-407, MR 2,10]
 (Paper 23) H.S.M. Coxeter, Regular and Semi-Regular Polytopes II, [Math. Zeit. 188 (1985) 559-591]
 (Paper 24) H.S.M. Coxeter, Regular and Semi-Regular Polytopes III, [Math. Zeit. 200 (1988) 3-45]
 Norman Johnson Uniform Polytopes, Manuscript (1991)
 N.W. Johnson: The Theory of Uniform Polytopes and Honeycombs, Ph.D. 
 x3o3x3o3o3o - sril, o3x3o3x3o3o - sabril, x3x3x3o3o3o - gril, o3x3x3x3o3o - gabril

External links 
 Polytopes of Various Dimensions
 Multi-dimensional Glossary

6-polytopes